Paper Man can refer to:

Films
 The Paper Man (1963 film), a 1963 Mexican film — vagabond with high-denomination banknote
 Paper Man (1971 film), a 1971 horror film — rogue computer murders students starring Dean Stockwell and Stefanie Powers
 Paper Man (2009 film), a 2009 independent comedy-drama film — writer with imaginary friend
 PaperMan, a six-minute Original Net Animation released with the mobile version of the video game 17 August 2011 years after glimpses were shown in the original CounterStrike skin
 Paperman (2012 film), a 2012 Disney animated short film
 The Paper Man (2020 film), a Canadian documentary film

Television
 The Paper Man (miniseries), the rise to power of an Australian media mogul called Philip Cromwell

Music
 Paper Man (1968 album), a 1968 album led by American jazz trumpeter Charles Tolliver
 The Paper Man, a 2008 cloud rap album by Viper.